John, Jon, or Jonathan Robertson may refer to:

Politicians

United Kingdom politicians
J. M. Robertson (John Mackinnon Robertson, 1856–1933), British journalist and Liberal MP for Tyneside 1906–1918
John Robertson (Bothwell MP) (1867–1926), MP for Bothwell, Lanarkshire 1919–1926
John Robertson (Berwick MP) (1898–1955), Labour Party MP 1945–1951 for Berwick and Haddington, then Berwick and East Lothian
John Robertson (Paisley MP) (1913–1987), Labour Party MP 1961–1979, co-founder of the Scottish Labour Party
John Home Robertson (born 1948), former MP and MSP
John Robertson (Glasgow MP) (born 1952), former Labour Member of Parliament for Glasgow North West

Australian politicians
John Robertson (premier) (1816–1891), fifth Premier of New South Wales
John Robertson (politician, born 1962), former Labor leader in New South Wales and opposition leader

Canadian politicians
John Robertson (Nova Scotia politician) (1784–1872), MP in the Nova Scotia House of Assembly
John Robertson (Canadian politician) (1799–1876), Scottish born member of the Canadian Senate from 1867
John F. Robertson (1841–1905), merchant, ship broker and political figure on Prince Edward Island
John Ross Robertson (1841–1918), Canadian newspaper publisher, politician, and philanthropist in Toronto, Ontario
John Duff Robertson (1873–1939), politician in Saskatchewan
John Alexander Robertson (1913–1965), Canadian Senator

New Zealand politicians
John Robertson (New Zealand politician, born 1875) (1875–1952), New Zealand Social Democratic & Labour politician
John Robertson (New Zealand politician, born 1951), mayor of Papakura District, New Zealand

United States politicians
John Robertson (congressman) (1787–1873), politician and lawyer from Virginia
John Brownlee Robertson (1809–1892), politician from Connecticut
John Dill Robertson (1871–1931), medical professional and politician

Sportsmen

Football (soccer)

Thomas Robertson (footballer, born 1875) (John Thomas Robertson, 1875–1923), Scottish footballer who played for Stoke, Liverpool and Southampton
John Tait Robertson (1877–1935), Scottish footballer, who played for Everton, Southampton and Rangers, and managed Chelsea
John Robertson (footballer, born 1884) (1884–1937), Scottish footballer, who played for Bolton Wanderers, Rangers and Southampton
Jackie Robertson (John Craig Robertson, 1928–2014), Scottish footballer
John Robertson (footballer, born 1953), Scottish footballer, who played for Nottingham Forest and Scotland
John Robertson (footballer, born 1964), Scottish footballer, who played for and managed Heart of Midlothian
John Robertson (footballer, born 1974), English footballer, who played for Wigan Athletic and Lincoln City
John Robertson (footballer, born 1976), Scottish footballer, who played for Ayr United
Jon Robertson (born 1989), Scottish footballer
Jonathan Robertson (born 1991), Dutch soccer player
John Robertson (footballer, born 2001), Scottish footballer, who plays for St Johnstone

Other sports
John Robertson (cricketer) (1809–1873), English cricketer
John W. Robertson ( 1912–1914), Australian rules football player
John Robertson (Olympic sailor) (1929–2020), Canadian sailor
John Robertson (Australian footballer) (1940–2001), Australian footballer, who played for Hawthorn
John Robertson (Paralympic sailor) (born 1972), British Paralympic sailor
John Robertson (American football) (born 1993), American football quarterback

Artists
J. G. Robertson (1859–1940), British singer and actor
John S. Robertson (1878–1964), Canadian film director
John Rae Robertson (1893–1956), better known as Rae Robertson, of the classical musical duo Bartlett and Robertson
John Robertson (composer) (born 1943), New Zealand born Canadian composer
John Robertson (comedian) (born 1985), comedian and host of Videogame Nation

Academics
John Robertson (mathematician) (1712–1776), English mathematician
John George Robertson (1867–1933), Scottish-born professor of German language and literature
John Monteath Robertson (1900–1989), Scottish chemist and crystallographer
John Harry Robertson (1923–2003), crystallographer
John A. Robertson (1943–2017), American writer and lecturer on law and bioethics
John Robertson (physicist) (born 1950), English physicist

Military
John Reid (British Army officer) (aka John Robertson, 1721–1807), British army general and founder of the chair of music at the University of Edinburgh
Private John Robertson (born c. 1780), U.S. soldier, participant in the Lewis and Clark Expedition
John Charles Robertson (army officer) (1894–1942), Australian Army officer
John Hartley Robertson, Special Forces Green Beret Master Sgt. and subject of the 2013 Canadian documentary film Unclaimed

Others
John Robertson (Scottish minister) (1768–1843), minister of Cambuslang, Scotland
John Parish Robertson (1792–1843), Scottish merchant and author
John Argyll Robertson (1800–1855), Scottish surgeon
John Robertson (pastoralist) (1808–1880), Scottish-born pastoralist in Australia
John Murray Robertson (1844–1901), Scottish architect
John C. Robertson (1848–1913), English-American contractor and builder
John Robinson (circus owner) (fl. 1870s), circus owner
John Robertson (Irish minister) (1868–1931), Irish Methodist
Wylie Watson (John Wylie Robertson, 1889–1966), British actor
John Holland Robertson (died 1909), of Robertson brothers, pioneers of South Australia
Sir John Robertson (ombudsman) (1925–2001), New Zealand chief ombudsman, 1986–1994
John Robertson (journalist) (1934–2014), hosted the interview portion of CBWT's 24Hours program in the late 1970s

Other uses
John Robertson Jr. House, a historic house in Barrington, Illinois

See also
Robertson (surname)
John Charles Robertson (disambiguation)
John Roberton (disambiguation)
Jack Robertson (disambiguation)
Jean Robertson (disambiguation) ("Jean" is the French equivalent of "John")